John Patten was a British footballer who played four matches, scoring twice, for Southampton in the Southern League in 1907.

Football career
Patten had played for Shrewsbury before coming to Southampton for a trial in March 1907. He had originally expected to play a reserve-team match at Ryde but, because of an injury crisis which had sidelined Jack Hogg, Alex Glen and Bill Gray, he was included in the first-team for the Southern League match against Watford on 30 March 1907, which ended 0–0. The local press commented that "his policy of parting before an  opponent can get to him is to be commended". He retained his place for the next two matches, scoring in a 3–2 defeat against West Ham United and a 4–2 victory at Northampton Town. He then lost his place to Edward Bell for two matches before being recalled for the final match of the season.

Despite his record of two goals from four matches, Patten was not given a contract by Southampton and returned to Shrewsbury.

References

External links
 Football career details

Year of birth unknown
Place of birth unknown
Year of death unknown
English footballers
Association football outside forwards
Shrewsbury Town F.C. players
Southampton F.C. players
Southern Football League players